British Society of Animal Science (BSAS) is a learned society in the field of animal science, established in 1944 as the British Society of Animal Production.

Mike Steele is the Chief Executive, and the President is Sinclair Mayne.  Geoff Simm was the president in 2007 and 2008.

Publications 
The first Proceedings was published in 1951.  The editors soon started accepting papers on animal production.

In 1959 the society established a dedicated journal, Animal Production, for this purpose.  It was published in three issues per year in 1961, and four issues per year in 1971.

In 1995, the society was renamed, and the journal retitled to Animal Science.

A partnership with Institut National de la Recherche Agronomique (INRA) and European Federation for Animal Science publish the journal Animal: An International Journal of Animal Bioscience.  The journal is a merge of three journals including the BSAS journal Animal Science, which was published six times a year.

Sir John Hammond Award 
The society presents the Sir John Hammond Award at the annual conference.  Recipients include:

 2009: Steve Bishop, Roslin Institute, Edinburgh
 2008: Richard Dewhurst, Teagasc, Ireland
 2007: Nigel Scollan, IGER, UK
 2006: Alistair Carson, ARINI, Northern Ireland
 2005: Kevin Sinclair, University of Nottingham
 2004: John Woolliams, Roslin Institute, Edinburgh
 2003: Iain Wright, Macauley, Aberdeen
 2002: Ilias Kyriazakis, SAC Edinburgh
 2001: Christopher Haley, Roslin Institute
 2000: Christoper K Reynolds, University of Reading
 1999: 
 1998: Ian Wilmut, Roslin Institute, Edinburgh
 1997: Geoff Simm, SAC, Edinburgh
 1996: Sinclair Mayne, ARINI, Northern Ireland
 1995: Janice I Harland, British Sugar
 1994: Cled Thomas, SAC Auchincruive
 1993: Will Haresign, University of Nottingham
 1992: Margaret Gill, NRI 
 1991: Jeff D Wood, University of Bristol 
 1990: John D Oldham, SAC Edinburgh
 1989: A John Webb, Cotswold Pig Development Company
 1988: Anthony J Kempster, MLC, Milton Keynes
 1987: E Robert Orskov, Rowett Research Inst
 1986: A John F Webster, University of Bristol
 1985:  
 1984: John J Robinson, Rowett Research Institute, Aberdeen
 1983: Colin T Whittemore, University of Edinburgh
 1982: R B Land
 1981: J Hodgson
 1980: J B Owen
 1979: P J Broadbent
 1978: W H Broster & I McDonald
 1977: G E Lamming
 1976: T R Preston
 1975: 
 1974: 
 1973: F W H Elsley
 1972: 
 1971: E J C Polge
 1970: St C S Taylor
 1969: 
 1968: D G Armstrong

References

External links 
 

Braintree District
Learned societies of the United Kingdom
Organisations based in Essex
1944 establishments in the United Kingdom